Warren and Mahoney is an international architectural and interior design practice - one of the few third generation architectural practices in the history of New Zealand architecture. It is a highly awarded architectural practice, with offices in New Zealand and Australia.

History
The practice was founded by Miles Warren in 1955, and with the award of the Dental Nurses Training School (now known as Central Nurses' Training School) Miles sought the assistance of his fellow atelier colleague Maurice Mahoney.  In 1958, the partnership of Warren and Mahoney was established.

The partnership created a distinctive form of architecture utilising a modern, brutalist style (described by Warren himself as "constructivist") involving widespread use of concrete and harsh geometric shapes. Several of their buildings in this style are now among the highlights of New Zealand modernism: Christchurch Town Hall, Harewood Crematorium, College House and Canterbury Students' Union being but a few. The style was influential within New Zealand, being a partial inspiration for Ted McCoy's Archway Lecture Theatre complex at the University of Otago, among other works.

Warren and Mahoney's designs are found in other centres throughout New Zealand, most notably those of Wellington's Michael Fowler Centre and Bowen House in Wellington and Auckland's Television New Zealand building.

Miles Warren was knighted in 1985 for his services to architecture and in 2003 named one of ten inaugural ‘Icons of the Arts’ by the Arts Foundation of New Zealand. Sir Miles Warren and Maurice Mahoney retired in the early 1990s.

Now a third generation multi-disciplinary practice with offices in Sydney, Melbourne, Auckland, Tauranga, Wellington, Christchurch and Queenstown, the practice has constructed projects around the Pacific Rim. Several works were destroyed and more still damaged by the 2011 Christchurch earthquake.

Notable designs

Buildings

 Harewood Crematorium (1963)
 College House (University of Canterbury) in Christchurch, New Zealand (1966)
 Christchurch Town Hall in Christchurch, New Zealand (1972)
 Cathedral of the Blessed Sacrament (1974–5)
 Embassy of New Zealand, Washington, D.C. (1975)
 Christchurch Central Library (1982)
 The Canterbury Trade Union Centre in Christchurch, New Zealand
 Radio New Zealand offices on Durham Street in Christchurch, New Zealand
 Christ's College's Chapman Block, "Big School" library, the sports hall and science block in Christchurch, New Zealand
 The University of Canterbury Students' Association in Christchurch, New Zealand
 The Wool Exchange (Whiteleigh Avenue) in Christchurch, New Zealand
 The Lyttelton Harbour Board building in Christchurch, New Zealand
 The Triangle Centre in Christchurch, New Zealand
 Hotel Grand Chancellor, Christchurch, New Zealand (1986)
 Clarendon Tower in Christchurch, New Zealand (1987)
 Park Royal Hotel, later known as Crowne Plaza, in Christchurch, New Zealand (1988)
 Forsyth Barr Building in Christchurch, New Zealand (1989)
 Bridgewater Apartments in Christchurch, New Zealand
 the Wigram Park housing complex at 1 Park Terrace in Christchurch, New Zealand
 Parliament buildings and library, Parliament House in Wellington, New Zealand
 New Zealand High Commission in New Delhi, India
 TVNZ in Auckland, New Zealand (1990)
 Michael Fowler Centre (1983) and Bowen House (1990) in Wellington, New Zealand
 Parliament building re-design and the Parliamentary Library (1987)
 Westpac Stadium in Wellington, New Zealand (2000)
 Yarrow Stadium in New Plymouth, Taranaki, New Zealand (2002)
 Wellington International Airport in Wellington, New Zealand (2010)
 New Zealand Supreme Court building refurbishment in Wellington, New Zealand (2010)

Monuments
 New Zealand Memorial (Korean War) – at the United Nations Memorial Cemetery in Busan, South Korea, built of marble from the Coromandel Peninsula

References

External links 
 Warren and Mahoney website
 Christchurch Modern
 Christchurch City Libraries 'Warren Miles'

Architecture firms of New Zealand
Companies based in Christchurch
Design companies established in 1955
1955 establishments in New Zealand